is a Japanese former volleyball player who competed in the 1972 Summer Olympics.

In 1972 she was part of the Japanese team which won the silver medal in the Olympic tournament. She played all five matches.

External links
 profile

1951 births
Living people
Japanese women's volleyball players
Olympic volleyball players of Japan
Volleyball players at the 1972 Summer Olympics
Olympic silver medalists for Japan
Nippon Sport Science University alumni
Olympic medalists in volleyball
Medalists at the 1972 Summer Olympics
20th-century Japanese women